The Same Sky is a 2017 German TV series. It is set during the 1970s in West Germany, depicting the Cold War. It portrays the fate of two families on either side of the Berlin Wall. The story revolves around the relationship between an East German "Romeo" agent – a spy who uses seduction as a way to unearth secrets — and his female targets in the West.

The series was screened as three feature-length episodes or as six hour-long episodes, depending on the broadcasting service. It was written by Paula Milne and directed by Oliver Hirschbiegel and stars Sofia Helin and Tom Schilling. The scripts were written in English and translated into German by the director. The series was produced by UFA Fiction in co-production with Beta Film for ZDF and Czech TV in association with Rainmark Films. It was filmed from 24 August 2015 to 6 December 2015 in Prague. The music score was written by Walter Mair and Vesselina Tchakarova. The series was originally broadcast in Germany in March 2017. In the UK, the series was shown on More4 in 2020.

The interest by Amazon and Netflix in acquiring the rights to carry The Same Sky was kindled by the earlier success of another series also featuring a young agent dispatched to West Germany under an assumed identity, Deutschland 83.

Cast

References

External links 

Television series set in the 1970s
2017 German television series debuts
Cold War fiction
Television shows set in Berlin
ZDF original programming
German-language television shows
Works about West Germany